Eckington School, also known as Poplar Ridge School, is a historic school building for African-American children located near Culpeper, Culpeper County, Virginia. It was built in 1895, and is a one-story, vernacular frame structure. It measures 20 feet by 26 feet, and is clad in weatherboard. It was used as a school until 1941, after which it was used as a church hall for the adjoining Free Union Baptist Church.  At that time, a 10 foot by 20 foot addition was built.

It was listed on the National Register of Historic Places in 2001.

References

African-American history of Virginia
School buildings on the National Register of Historic Places in Virginia
School buildings completed in 1820
Schools in Culpeper County, Virginia
National Register of Historic Places in Culpeper County, Virginia